Luleå (locally ;) is a city on the coast of northern Sweden, and the capital of Norrbotten County, the northernmost county in Sweden. Luleå has 48,728 inhabitants in its urban core (2018) and is the seat of Luleå Municipality (with a total population of 77,832). Luleå is Sweden's 25th largest city and Norrbotten County's largest city.

Luleå has the seventh biggest harbour in Sweden for shipping goods. It has a large steel industry and is a centre for extensive research. It is also home to the Swedish Air Force Wing Norrbotten Wing (F 21) based in Luleå Airport. Luleå University of Technology is one of Sweden's three technology universities (the other two are KTH and Chalmers) and the northernmost university in Sweden. The university has approximately 15,000 students.

History 

The town's Royal charter was granted in 1621 by King Gustavus Adolphus of Sweden. The original town was situated where Gammelstad (Old Town) is situated today. The town had to be moved in 1649 to the current site, due to the post-glacial rebound that had made the bay too shallow for ships to enter.

The Gammelstad Church Town is a UNESCO World Heritage Site. 

In 1805, Luleå only had 947 inhabitants, but in 1865 Luleå succeeded Piteå as the county town in Norrbotten county and now had around 1400 residents. In the 1860s the industries also started taking root in the city.

The town has been plagued by fires in 1653, 1657 and in 1887, and
the fire in 1887 was a devastating fire that destroyed most of the town, sparing only a few buildings. The Neo-Gothic Cathedral (originally the Oscar Fredrik church), dedicated in 1893, standing at 67 meters (220 ft), is the tallest building in town.

Geography

Residential areas 

 Bergviken
 Björkskatan
 Centrum
 Hertsön
 Kronan
 Lerbäcken
 Lulsundet
 Lövskatan
 Malmudden
 Mjölkudden
 Notviken
 Porsön
 Skurholmen
 Örnäset
 Östermalm

Localities 

 Bergnäset
 Gammelstaden
 Karlsvik

Economy 

Luleå's commerce and industry are a mix of industry, research, education, trade, and services.

Major employers in the city are the SSAB steelworks and Luleå University of Technology.  A Swedish Air Force wing, F 21 (or Norrbotten Air Force Wing), is stationed near Luleå at the neighbouring Luleå Airport.  Other major employers include Ferruform (a subsidiary of Scania AB) and Gestamp HardTech (acquired from SSAB 2005-01-01).

IT industry 
The information technology industry in Luleå has about 2000 employees (2008).

Luleå is the home of several major innovations and technological milestones.

 Broadcast radio: RDS, DAB, DARC (1992–1997)
 The Luleå algorithm for routing (1997)
 Living Labs: leading European service testbed with 6000 users (2001–)
 Marratech: pioneers in Internet-based E-meetings (1998–) – acquired by Google, releasing in November 2008 video-chat support in Gmail
 Arena project, IT in Sports: sensors, handheld wireless video (1999–2002) 
 Estreet project: First large-scale mobile marketing experiment (2000) 
 On 27 October 2011, Facebook announced it would locate its first data center outside of the United States in Luleå. The whole facility is made up by a set of three  buildings. The first building was to be operational in 2012. The establishment will help turn the Luleå region into a major node for European data traffic. The town's northern location and that it will become a hub for data traffic in Europe has generated a new epithet for the Luleå region – The Node Pole. The Node Pole region provides stable, low-cost electricity that is 100-percent derived from renewable sources. In addition, they cite the benefits of low cooling expenses, given that the region is one of the coolest in Sweden. Sweden's long political stability is cited as another long-term benefit of the Node Pole's location.

Facebook expands into Luleå

The new European computer centre in Luleå is Facebook's first investment outside of the US. Some of the reasons that Facebook choose Luleå were because of natural cooling due to the climate, cheap electricity, reliable electrical networks, and clean energy.

The computer center will process large amounts of data through thousands of computers working as one. The establishment of Facebook in Luleå has also led to other companies realizing the potential of establishing in Luleå. The positive effect has also been noticeable at the university where the applications rate has risen by 18 percent — Luleå Science Park has also had an increase of 25 percent of new established companies.

Climate 
Luleå has a subarctic climate (Dfc), which borders on a humid continental climate (Dfb) with short, mild to warm summers and long, cold, snowy winters.

Due to the Gulf Stream, Luleå has a warmer climate than other cities on the same latitude and even some that are further south in Canada, Alaska, Northeast China and Siberia. Summers are very bright, with marginal twilight being the only exception during the summer solstice.

Media 
Newspapers include:
 Norrbottens-Kuriren
 Norrländska Socialdemokraten

Transportation

Public transport 
Public transport in Luleå is operated by Luleå Lokaltrafik and consists of five main bus lines, an additional five bus lines, and direct connection bus traffic and night bus service. From Luleå Bus station, Länstrafiken i Norrbotten operates several regional bus lines within Norrbotten County.

Air 

Luleå Airport (IATA: LLA, ICAO: ESPA), located 7 km (5 mi) south of the city centre, is the fifth largest airport in Sweden, with about 1.2 million yearly passengers. It is the largest airport in Norrland. The domestic route to Stockholm Arlanda Airport is the third busiest domestic route in Sweden with over 1 million passengers per year. Luleå Lokaltrafik operates connections to and from Luleå Airport via Line 4 and 104.

In total, there are seven scheduled destinations and about 15 additional charter destinations. The Stockholm Arlanda Airport route is operated by Scandinavian Airlines and Norwegian Air Shuttle and serves the vast majority of passengers at the airport with about 16 daily connections each way. Scandinavian Airlines also operates a direct connection to Göteborg Landvetter Airport.

Nextjet operates connections to and from Göteborg Landvetter Airport via Höga Kusten Airport, and their Tromsø Airport – Oulu Airport route lands at Luleå airport on some departures. Jonair offers connections to Pajala Airport.

Rail 
Vy Tåg operates a night train services northbound for Kiruna and Narvik, and southbound for Stockholm. Norrtåg operates train services from Luleå to Umeå, Kiruna and Haparanda.

Shopping 
The world's first indoor mall was opened in Luleå in 1955 (architect: Ralph Erskine) and was named Shopping. There are two other malls in Luleå: Strand and Smedjan. The main shopping streets in Luleå are Storgatan and Kungsgatan. A few kilometres outside Luleå there is a shopping centre called Storheden.

Culture 
In January 2007 the Cultural House (Kulturens Hus) was opened. A library, concerts, and art exhibitions are all hosted here.

Luleå is also home to hardcore punk band Raised Fist, melodic death metal band The Duskfall, power metal band Machinae Supremacy and death 'n' roll band Helltrain.

One of the largest winter festivals in Luleå is the indoor Minus 30-festivalen, held at Kulturens hus (the House of Culture) annually on a Saturday in mid-March.

Luleå Hamnfestival (Luleå harbor festival) is a big summer event in the center of Luleå, mostly centered around the north harbor. The festival has been a recurring event each summer since 2013. Held in July, it is a free event not targeting a specific group. The festival is the new version of Luleåkalaset which was held each summer from 2002 to 2012, which itself replaced sjöslaget, the summer festival from 1988 to 2002.

Musikens makt (The power of music) is a smaller, free music festival that is held each summer in August at Gültzauudden since 2010.

Ice music is a new art form where professional musicians play on instruments made out of ice. The concerts are performed in a huge igloo and the instruments pulsate in all the colors of the rainbow.

Luleå is the base for the Norrbotten Band of the Home Guard Music which concists of voluntary musicians from Norrbotten County's Home Guard.

Sports 
Luleå has many teams competing in a variety of sports.

Four teams in Luleå compete in the highest Swedish leagues: Luleå Basket (female basketball team, previously called Northland Basket); BC Luleå (male basketball team, previously named Plannja Basket and LF Basket Norrland); and Luleå Hockey/MSSK (Munksund-Skuthamns Sportklubb) (female ice hockey team) and Luleå Hockey (male ice hockey team).

Luleå Basket has won two Swedish championships (2014 and 2015), while BC Luleå has won eight Swedish championships (1997, 1999, 2000, 2002, 2004, 2006, 2007 and 2017). Luleå Hockey/MSSK female team won their first Swedish Championship in 2016 while the male Luleå Hockey team has won one Swedish Championship in 1996, the European Trophy in 2012 and the Champions Hockey League in 2015.

Football 
 Bergnäsets AIK
 Ersnäs IF
 IFK Luleå
 Lira BK
 Luleå SK
 Notvikens IK

Ice hockey 
 Luleå HF play in the Swedish Hockey League 
 Luleå HF/MSSK play in the SDHL

Basketball 
 BC Luleå, formerly LF Basket Norrbotten and Plannja, for men and Luleå Basket for women; Plannja has won Basketligan seven times, which is a record

Yukigassen 
The Swedish Championship in Yukigassen is held in Luleå annually.

UNESCO World Heritage 
 Gammelstad Church Town

Notable people 

 Acting & Art
 Martin Ljung (1917–2010) a Swedish comedian, actor and singer
 Gösta Wallmark (1928–2017) a Swedish artist
 Lena Granhagen (born 1938) a Swedish actress and singer
 Bernt Ström (1940–2009) a Swedish actor
 Hans Ernback (1942–2013) a Swedish actor between 1966 and 1984
 Maud Adams (born 1945) Swedish actress, appeared in two James Bond films
 Fanny Gjörup (1961–2001) a Swedish child actress
 Mamma Andersson (born 1962) aka Karin Andersson, a Swedish artist of domestic interiors, lush landscapes and genre scenes
 Gry Forssell (born 1973) a Swedish TV host and radio talk-show host; brought up in Luleå

 Writing
 Nels F. S. Ferré (1908–1971) a theologian and writer on Christian theology 
 Erik Lindegren (1910–1968) a Swedish author, poet, critical writer and member of the Swedish Academy 
 Staffan Göthe (born 1944) a Swedish playwright, actor and director
 Katarina Kieri (born 1965) a Swedish writer

 Classical Music 
 Ingvar Wixell (1931–2011) a Swedish baritone, active from 1955 to 2003
 Gunnar Wiklund (1935–1989) a Swedish singer
 Malin Gjörup (1964–2020) a Swedish actress, mezzo-soprano and producer at Gävle Symphony Orchestra
 Peter Mattei (born 1965) a Swedish operatic baritone

 Modern Music
 Gunnar Wiklund (1935–1989) a Swedish singer of Schlager music 
 Emilia de Poret (born 1976) a Swedish singer, fashion designer and editor
 Zacke (born 1983) aka Zakarias Lekberg, rapper
 The Bear Quartet (formed 1989) a Swedish indie rock band
 Elizabeth and Victoria Lejonhjärta (born 1990) raised in Luleå, Swedish twin models, and writers; work with rapper Drake
 Him Kerosene (formed 1991) a Swedish alternative rock band 
 Breach (active 1993–2002) a defunct Swedish post-hardcore band
 Raised Fist (formed in 1993) a Swedish hardcore punk band
 The Duskfall (formed in 1999) a Swedish melodic death metal band
 Machinae Supremacy (formed 2000) a Swedish modern heavy metal, power metal and alternative rock band 
 Movits! (formed 2007) a Swedish swing and hip hop band

 Public Service
 Erik Benzelius the Elder (1632–1709) a Swedish theologian and Archbishop of Uppsala
 Anders Hackzell (1705–1757) the chief enforcement officer and cartographer for the Swedish crown. 
 Paul Petter Waldenström (1838–1917) a Swedish theologian, leader of the free church 
 Fritiof Enbom (1918–1974) a Swedish railway worker and convicted spy for the Soviet Union
 Marita Ulvskog (born 1951) a Swedish politician and Member of the European Parliament
 Jan Lexell (born 1958) a Swedish physician and academic, specialises in rehabilitation medicine and neurology
 Åsa Nyström (born 1960) a Swedish prelate and current bishop of the Diocese of Luleå
 Amanda Lind (born 1980) a Swedish politician, since 2019 the Culture minister and Democracy minister

 Business
 John W. Nordstrom (1871–1963) a Swedish American businessman, co-founded the chain store Nordstrom
 Stephan Gip (born 1936) a Swedish designer and interior designer
 Leif Östling (born 1945) CEO of Scania AB
 Adam Dunkels (born 1978) a Swedish computer scientist, programmer and entrepreneur

 Sport
 August Wikström (1874–1954) a Swedish sports shooter, competed in the 1912 Summer Olympics
 Robert Zander (1895–1966) a Swedish footballer, competed in the 1920 Summer Olympics
 Sigge Bergman (1905–2001) a Swedish sports executive, secretary general of the International Ski Federation 1961–1979
 Stig Lundholm (1917–2009) a Swedish chess master, won 1944 Swedish Chess Championship 
 Sonja Edstrom (born 1930) a retired Swedish cross-country skier, competed at the 1952, 1956 and 1960 Olympics
 Runald Beckman (born 1951) a Swedish athlete, competed in the 1976 Summer Olympics and the 1980 Winter Olympics 
 Lars Petrus (born 1960) an accomplished speedcuber 
 Göran Titus (born 1967) a former Swedish freestyle swimmer, competed in the 1988 and 1992 Summer Olympics 
 Magnus Ingesson (born 1971) a Swedish cross country skier, competed in the 2002 Winter Olympics 
 Jonas Eriksson (born 1974) a former Swedish football referee, a full FIFA referee 2002–2018
 Sara Eriksson (born 1974) a retired amateur Swedish freestyle wrestler
 Peter Larsson (born 1978) a Swedish cross-country skier, competed at the 2006 Winter Olympics
 Per Ledin (born 1978) a Swedish professional ice hockey forward
 Niklas Bäckström (born 1989) semi-retired Swedish mixed martial arts fighter, competed in the UFC
 Anders Nilsson (born 1990) a Swedish professional ice hockey goaltender
 Alexander Majorov (born 1991) a Swedish figure skater, lives in Luleå
 Linus Werneman (born 1992), Swedish professional ice hockey player

Other
Märta Bucht (1882–1962), suffragist and peace activist

Panorama

See also 
 Diocese of Luleå
 Luleå Cathedral
 North Sweden European Office

References

External links 

 The official guide for the location Luleå

 
County seats in Sweden
Populated places in Luleå Municipality
Norrbotten
Coastal cities and towns in Sweden
Municipal seats of Norrbotten County
Swedish municipal seats
Cities in Norrbotten County